de Neville then Neville is an English masculine given name, toponymic surname and the name of several places. All three are derived from "new town" in Norman and French word. As a given name, it is chiefly used in the United Kingdom, Canada, Australia, South Africa, and Ireland. 

Notable people with the name include:

House of Neville 
The House of Neville was a powerful noble family of England that was prominent in the medieval period. Its members include:
Alan de Neville (forester) (died c. 1176), Chief Forester of England
Alan de Neville (landholder) (died after 1168), medieval landholder
Alexander Neville (1340–1392), Archbishop of York
Anne Neville (1456–1485), Queen of England, consort of Richard III
Cecily Neville (1415–1495), Duchess of York, mother of Edward IV and Richard III
George Neville (archbishop) (1432–1476), Archbishop of York
Henry Neville (politician) (1562–1615), English politician
Hugh de Neville (died 1234), Chief Forester and sheriff
Isabel Neville (1451–1476), Duchess of Clarence, daughter of the Kingmaker
Katherine Neville, Baroness Hastings (1442–1503)
Ralph Neville, 1st Earl of Westmorland (1364–1425)
Ralph Neville (died 1244), Lord Chancellor of England, Archbishop of Canterbury-elect
Richard Neville, 5th Earl of Salisbury (1400–1460)
Richard Neville, 16th Earl of Warwick (1428–1471), known as the Kingmaker
William Neville, Earl of Kent (1410–1463)

Surname 
 A family of American musicians, members of the R&B-soul-funk group The Neville Brothers:
 brothers and founding members:
 Art Neville (1937–2019), singer and keyboardist
 Aaron Neville (born 1941), singer, songwriter, and multi-instrumentalist
 Charles Neville (musician) (1938–2018), saxophonist
 Cyril Neville (born 1948), singer and percussionist
 Ivan Neville (born 1959), singer and keyboardist, later member of the group; son of Aaron
Adam Nevill (born 1969), British writer
Anita Neville (born 1942), Canadian politician
A. O. Neville (1875–1954), Australian civil servant
Arthel Neville (born 1962), American journalist
Cynthia Neville, Canadian historian
Dan Neville (born 1946), Irish politician
Edgar Neville (1899–1967), Spanish film director
Emily Neville (1919–1997), American author
Eric Harold Neville (1889–1961), English mathematician
Gary Neville (born 1975), English football player and brother of Phil
 Hensley Anthony Neville (1957 - 1992), Singaporean convicted murderer
Jill Neville (1932–1997), Australian novelist
John Neville (actor) (1925–2011), British actor
John Neville (general) (1731–1803), American soldier
Joseph Neville (1730–1819), American politician
Joy Neville (born 1983), Irish rugby union player and referee
Katherine Neville (author), American author
Keith Neville (1884–1959), American politician
Mike Neville (newsreader) (1936–2017), British television presenter
Neville Neville (1949–2015), former league cricketer and father of footballers Gary and Phil Neville
Paul Neville (politician) (1940–2019), Australian politician
Peter Neville, Australian rules footballer
Phil Neville (born 1977), English football player and brother of Gary
Presley Neville (1756–1818), American soldier
Ralph Neville (MP) (1848–1918), British politician and judge
Richard Neville (singer) (born 1979), British singer
Richard Neville (writer) (1941–2016), Australian writer
Tracey Neville (born 1977), English netball player
Wendell Cushing Neville (1870–1930), American marine general
William Neville (1843–1909), American politician

Given name 
Neville Alexander (1936–2012), South African activist
Neville Ashenheim (1900−1984), Jamaican diplomat
Neville Bonner (1922−1999), Australian politician
Neville Brand (1920−1992), American actor
Neville Brody (born 1957), British graphic designer
Neville Buswell (1943–2019), British actor
Neville Cardus (1888−1975), British writer and critic
Neville Chamberlain (1869−1940), British politician
Neville Dawes (1926–1984), Nigerian-born writer of Jamaican parentage
Neville Duke (1922−2007), British aviator
Neville Fernando (1931–2021), Sri Lankan Sinhala doctor, politician
Neville Gallimore (born 1997), American football player
Neville Glover (born 1955), Australian rugby league footballer
Neville Jansz, Sri Lankan diplomat
Neville Ubeysingha Jayawardena (1908–2002), Sri Lankan Sinhala economist, senator, Governor of the Central Bank of Sri Lanka from 1953–1954
Neville Kanakaratna (1923–1999), Sri Lankan Sinhala diplomat
Neville Karunatilake (1930–2010), Governor of the Central Bank of Sri Lanka from 1988–1992
Neville Laski (1890−1969), British judge
Neville Livingston (1947-2021), better known as Bunny Wailer, Jamaican musician
Neville Liyanage (born 1975), Sri Lankan Sinhala cricketer
Sir Neville Marriner (1924–2016), English conductor and violinist
Neville Neville (1949–2015), former league cricketer and father of footballers Gary and Phil Neville
Neville Patterson (1916–1987), chief justice of the Supreme Court of Mississippi
Neville Samarakoon (1919–1990), Sri Lankan judge
Neville Sellwood (1922−1962), Australian jockey
Neville Stamp (born 1981), English former professional footballer
Neville Staple (born 1955), British singer
Neville Southall (born 1958), Welsh former professional footballer
Neville Tong (1934–2019), English cyclist
Neville Wadia (1911−1996), Indian businessman
Neville Wanless (1931–2020), English broadcaster
Neville Wran (1926−2014), Australian politician

Pseudonym or stage name 
Adrian Neville (born 1986), ring name of Benjamin Satterley, a British professional wrestler now best known as simply Neville
Naomi Neville, pseudonym of American songwriter and musician Allen Toussaint (1938–2015)

Fictional characters 
Neville, a character from Need for Speed: Carbon 
Kate Neville, a character in the Marvel Comics universe
Robert Neville, a character in the 1954 novel I Am Legend by Richard Matheson
Neville, a character from Thomas and Friends
Neville Ashworth, a character in the television series Hollyoaks
Neville Flynn, a character in the 2006 film Snakes on a Plane
Neville Hope, a character in Auf Wiedersehen, Pet
Neville Longbottom, a character in the Harry Potter series
Neville Sinclair, a character in the 1991 film The Rocketeer
Nev the Bear, character from CBBC
Nevel Papperman, an antagonist in iCarly
Neville McPhee, a character in the Australian soap opera Home and Away
Neville, a character in Luigi's Mansion

Surnames of Norman origin